User-generated content (UGC), alternatively known as user-created content (UCC), is any form of content, such as images, videos, text, testimonials, and audio, that has been posted by users on online platforms such as social media, discussion forums and wikis. It is a product consumers create to disseminate information about online products or the firms that market them.

User-generated content is used for a wide range of applications, including problem processing, news, entertainment, customer engagement, advertising, gossip, research and many more. It is an example of the democratization of content production and the flattening of traditional media hierarchies. The BBC adopted a user-generated content platform for its websites in 2005, and TIME Magazine named "You" as the Person of the Year in 2006, referring to the rise in the production of UGC on Web 2.0 platforms. CNN also developed a similar user-generated content platform, known as iReport. There are other examples of news channels implementing similar protocols, especially in the immediate aftermath of a catastrophe or terrorist attack. Social media users can provide key eyewitness content and information that may otherwise have been inaccessible. By 2020 businesses are increasingly leveraging User Generated Content to promote their products, as it is seen as a cost effective and authentic way to grow a brand's image and sales. Due to new media and technology affordances, such as low cost and low barriers to entry, the Internet is an easy platform to create and dispense user-generated content, allowing the dissemination of information at a rapid pace in the wake of an event.

Definition
The advent of user-generated content marked a shift among media organizations from creating online content to providing facilities for amateurs to publish their own content. User-generated content has also been characterized as citizen media as opposed to the "packaged goods media" of the past century. Citizen Media is audience-generated feedback and news coverage. People give their reviews and share stories in the form of user-generated and user-uploaded audio and user-generated video. The former is a two-way process in contrast to the one-way distribution of the latter. Conversational or two-way media is a key characteristic of so-called Web 2.0 which encourages the publishing of one's own content and commenting on other people's content.

The role of the passive audience, therefore, has shifted since the birth of new media, and an ever-growing number of participatory users are taking advantage of the interactive opportunities, especially on the Internet to create independent content. Grassroots experimentation then generated an innovation in sounds, artists, techniques, and associations with audiences which then are being used in mainstream media. The active, participatory and creative audience is prevailing today with relatively accessible media, tools, and applications, and its culture is in turn affecting mass media corporations and global audiences.

The Organisation for Economic Co-operation and Development (OECD) has defined three central schools for UGC:

 Publication requirement: While user-generated content (UGC) could be made by a user and never published online or elsewhere, we focus here on the work that is published in some context, be it on a publicly accessible website or on a page on a social networking site only accessible to a select group of people (e.g., fellow university students). This is a useful way to exclude email, two-way instant messages, and the like.
 Creative effort: Creative effort was put into creating the work or adapting existing works to construct a new one; i.e. users must add their own value to the work. UGC often also has a collaborative element to it, as is the case with websites that users can edit collaboratively. For example, merely copying a portion of a television show and posting it to an online video website (an activity frequently seen on the UGC sites) would not be considered UGC. However, uploading photographs, expressing one's thoughts in a blog post or creating a new music video could be considered UGC. Yet the minimum amount of creative effort is hard to define and depends on the context.
 Creation outside of professional routines and practices: User-generated content is generally created outside of professional routines and practices. It often does not have an institutional or a commercial market context. In extreme cases, UGC may be produced by non-professionals without the expectation of profit or remuneration. Motivating factors include connecting with peers, achieving a certain level of fame, notoriety, or prestige, and the desire to express oneself.

It is important to have an objective before attempting to become part of the UGC/social networking environment. For example, companies may ask users to post their reviews directly to their Facebook page. This could end up disastrous if a user makes a comment that steers people away from the product.

Mere copy & paste or hyperlinking could also be seen as user-generated self-expression. The action of linking to a work or copying a work could in itself motivate the creator, express the taste of the person linking or copying. Digg.com, StumbleUpon.com, and leaptag.com are good examples of where such linkage to work happens. The culmination of such linkages could very well identify the tastes of a person in the community and make that person unique.

User-generated content occurs when a product's customers create and disseminate online ideas about a product or the firm that markets it. These ideas are often in the form of text but also come in other forms such as music, photos, or videos. UGC has three key characteristics: (1) The contribution is by users of a product rather than the firm that sells this product; (2) it is creative in nature and the user adds something new; (3) it is posted online and generally accessible.

Media pluralism 

According to Cisco Systems, in 2016 an average of 96,000 petabytes was transferred monthly over the Internet, more than twice as many as in 2012. In 2016, the number of active websites surpassed 1 billion, up from approximately 700 million in 2012. This means the content we currently have access to is more diverse than ever before.

Reaching 1.66 billion daily active users in Q4 2019, Facebook has emerged as the most popular social media platform globally. Other social media platforms are also dominant at the regional level such as: Twitter in Japan, Naver in the Republic of Korea, Instagram (owned by Facebook) and LinkedIn (owned by Microsoft) in Africa, VKontakte (VK) and Odnoklassniki (eng. Classmates) in Russia and other countries in Central and Eastern Europe, WeChat and QQ in China.

However, a concentration phenomenon is occurring globally giving the dominance to a few online platforms that become popular for some unique features they provide, most commonly for the added privacy they offer users through disappearing messages or end-to-end encryption (e.g. WhatsApp, Snapchat, Signal, and Telegram), but they have tended to occupy niches and to facilitate the exchanges of information that remain rather invisible to larger audiences.

Production of freely accessible information has been increasing since 2012. In January 2017, Wikipedia had more than 43 million articles, almost twice as many as in January 2012. This corresponded to a progressive diversification of content and increase in contributions in languages other than English. In 2017, less than 12 percent of Wikipedia content was in English, down from 18 percent in 2012. Graham, Straumann, and Hogan say that increase in the availability and diversity of content has not radically changed the structures and processes for the production of knowledge. For example, while content on Africa has dramatically increased, a significant portion of this content has continued to be produced by contributors operating from North America and Europe, rather than from Africa itself.

History
The massive, multi-volume Oxford English Dictionary was exclusively composed of user-generated content. In 1857, Richard Chenevix Trench of the London Philological Society sought public contributions throughout the English-speaking world for the creation of the first edition of the OED. As Simon Winchester recounts:

So what we're going to do, if I have your agreement that we're going to produce such a dictionary, is that we're going to send out invitations, were going to send these invitations to every library, every school, every university, every book shop that we can identify throughout the English-speaking world... everywhere where English is spoken or read with any degree of enthusiasm, people will be invited to contribute words. And the point is, the way they do it, the way they will be asked and instructed to do it, is to read voraciously and whenever they see a word, whether it's a preposition or a sesquipedalian monster, they are to... if it interests them and if where they read it, they see it in a sentence that illustrates the way that that word is used, offers the meaning of the day to that word, then they are to write it on a slip of paper... the top left-hand side you write the word, the chosen word, the catchword, which in this case is 'twilight'. Then the quotation, the quotation illustrates the meaning of the word. And underneath it, the citation, where it came from, whether it was printed or whether it was in manuscript... and then the reference, the volume, the page and so on... and send these slips of paper, these slips are the key to the making of this dictionary, into the headquarters of the dictionary.

In the following decades, hundreds of thousands of contributions were sent to the editors.

In the 1990s several electronic bulletin board systems were based on user-generated content. Some of these systems have been converted into websites, including the film information site IMDb which started as rec.arts.movies in 1990. With the growth of the World Wide Web the focus moved to websites, several of which were based on user-generated content, including Wikipedia (2001) and Flickr (2004).

User-generated Internet video was popularized by YouTube, an online video platform founded by Chad Hurley, Jawed Karim and Steve Chen in April 2005. It enabled the video streaming of MPEG-4 AVC (H.264) user-generated content from anywhere on the World Wide Web.

The BBC set up a pilot user-generated content team in April 2005 with 3 staff. In the wake of the 7 July 2005 London bombings and the Buncefield oil depot fire, the team was made permanent and was expanded, reflecting the arrival in the mainstream of the citizen journalist. After the Buncefield disaster the BBC received over 5,000 photos from viewers. The BBC does not normally pay for content generated by its viewers.

In 2006 CNN launched CNN iReport, a project designed to bring user-generated news content to CNN. Its rival Fox News Channel launched its project to bring in user-generated news, similarly titled "uReport". This was typical of major television news organizations in 2005–2006, who realized, particularly in the wake of the London 7 July bombings, that citizen journalism could now become a significant part of broadcast news. Sky News, for example, regularly solicits for photographs and video from its viewers.

User-generated content was featured in Time magazine's 2006 Person of the Year, in which the person of the year was "you", meaning all of the people who contribute to user-generated media, including YouTube, Wikipedia and MySpace. A precursor to user-generated content uploaded on YouTube was America's Funniest Home Videos.

Motivation for creating UGC
The benefits derived from user-generated content for the content host are clear, these include a low-cost promotion, positive impact on product sales, and fresh content. However, the benefit to the contributor is less direct. There are various theories behind the motivation for contributing user-generated content, ranging from altruistic, to social, to materialistic. Due to the high value of user-generated content, many sites use incentives to encourage their generation. These incentives can be generally categorized into implicit incentives and explicit incentives. Sometimes, users are also given monetary incentives to encourage them to create captivating and inspiring UGC.

 Implicit incentives: These incentives are not based on anything tangible. Social incentives are the most common form of implicit incentives. These incentives allow the user to feel good as an active member of the community. These can include the relationship between users, such as Facebook's friends, or Twitter's followers. Social incentives also include the ability to connect users with others, as seen on the sites already mentioned as well as sites like YouTube, Instagram, and Twitter, which allow users to share media from their lives with others. Users also share the experiences that they have while using a particular product/service. This will improve the customer experience as they can make informed decisions in buying a product, which makes them smart buyers. Other common social incentives are status, badges, or levels within the site, something a user earns when they reach a certain level of participation which may or may not come with additional privileges. Yahoo! Answers is an example of this type of social incentive. Another social incentive is social comparison. Being aware of the user's own ranking or level among the whole community could affect the behavior as well. Social incentives cost the host site very little and can catalyze vital growth; however, their very nature requires a sizable existing community before it can function. Social incentive can also be split into identification and integration. The identification motivation has strong external standardization and internalization of behavioral goals, such as social identity, that is, users will follow some subjective norms and images to constrain and practice their behaviors. The integration has the strongest external standardization and goal internalization, and the agent often integrates its actual actions with the subjective norms of the environment, so it has the effect of self-restraint and self-realization, such as the sense of belonging. Naver Knowledge-iN is another example of this type of social incentive. It uses a point system to encourage users to answer more questions by receiving points.
 Explicit incentives: These incentives refer to tangible rewards. Explicit incentives can be split into externality and projection. External motivation is more inclined to economic and material incentives, such as the reward for engaging in a task, which has little internalization and lacks relevant external norms and constraints. Examples include financial payment, entry into a contest, a voucher, a coupon, or frequent traveler miles. Direct explicit incentives are easily understandable by most and have immediate value regardless of the community size; sites such as the Canadian shopping platform Wishabi and Amazon Mechanical Turk both use this type of financial incentive in slightly different ways to encourage users participation. The projective agent has some external norms, but the degree of internalization is not enough, that is, it has not been fully recognized by the actor. The drawback to explicit incentives is that they may cause the user to be subject to the overjustification effect, eventually believing the only reason for participating is for the explicit incentive. This reduces the influence of the other form of social or altruistic motivation, making it increasingly costly for the content host to retain long-term contributors.

Ranking and assessment
The distribution of UGC across the Web provides a high volume data source that is accessible for analysis, and offers utility in enhancing the experiences of end users. Social science research can benefit from having access to the opinions of a population of users, and use this data to make inferences about their traits. Applications in information technology seek to mine end user data to support and improve machine-based processes, such as information retrieval and recommendation. However, processing the high volumes of data offered by UGC necessitate the ability to automatically sort and filter these data points according to their value.

Determining the value of user contributions for assessment and ranking can be difficult due to the variation in the quality and structure of this data. The quality and structure of the data provided by UGC is application-dependent, and can include items such as tags, reviews, or comments that may or may not be accompanied by useful metadata. Additionally, the value of this data depends on the specific task for which it will be utilized and the available features of the application domain. Value can ultimately be defined and assessed according to whether the application will provide service to a crowd of humans, a single end user, or a platform designer.

The variation of data and specificity of value has resulted in various approaches and methods for assessing and ranking UGC. The performance of each method essentially depends on the features and metrics that are available for analysis. Consequently, it is critical to have an understanding of the task objective and its relation to how the data is collected, structured, and represented in order to choose the most appropriate approach to utilizing it. The methods of assessment and ranking can be categorized into two classes: human-centered and machine-centered. Methods emphasizing human-centered utility consider the ranking and assessment problem in terms of the users and their interactions with the system, whereas the machine-centered method considers the problem in terms of machine learning and computation. The various methods of assessment and ranking can be classified into one of four approaches: community-based, user-based, designer-based, and hybrid.
 Community-based approaches rely on establishing ground truth based on the wisdom of the crowd regarding the content of interest. The assessments provided by the community of end users is utilized to directly rank content within the system in human-centered methods. The machine-centered method applies these community judgments in training algorithms to automatically assess and rank UGC.
 User-based approaches emphasize the differences between individual users so that ranking and assessment can interactively adapt or be personalized given the particular requirements of each user.  The human-centered approach accentuates interactive interfaces where the user can define and redefine their preferences as their interests shift. On the other hand, machine-centered approaches model the individual user according to explicit and implicit knowledge that is gathered through system interactions.
 Designer-based approaches primarily use machine-centered methods to essentially maximize the diversity of content presented to users in order to avoid constraining the space of topic selections or perspectives. The diversity of content can be assessed with respect to various dimensions, such as authorship, topics, sentiments, and named entities.
 Hybrid approaches seek to combine methods from the various frameworks in order to develop a more robust approach for assessing and ranking UGC. Approaches are most often combined in one of two ways: the crowd-based approach is often used to identify hyperlocal content for a user-based approach, or a user-based approach is used to maintain the intent of a designer-based approach.

Key concepts
 contribution is by users of a product rather than the firm
 creative in nature and adds something new
 posted online and generally accessible.

Types
There are many types of user-generated content: Internet forums, where people talk about different topics; blogs are services where users can post about many topics, product reviews on a supplier website or in social media; wikis such as Wikipedia and Fandom allow users, sometimes including anonymous users, to edit the content. Another type of user-generated content are social networking sites like Facebook, Instagram, Tumblr, Twitter, Snapchat, Twitch, TikTok or VK, where users interact with other people via chatting, writing messages, posting images or links, and sharing content.  Media hosting sites such as YouTube allow users to post content. Some forms of user-generated content, such as a social commentary blog, can be considered as a form of citizen journalism.

Blogs 

Blogs are websites created by individuals, groups, and associations. They mostly consist of journal-style text and enable interaction between a blogger and reader in the form of online comments. Self-hosted blogs can be created by professional entities such as entrepreneurs and small businesses. Blog hosting platforms include WordPress, Blogger, and Medium; Typepad is often used by media companies; Weebly is geared for online shopping. Social networking blogging platforms include Tumblr, LiveJournal, and Sina Weibo. Among the many blogs on the web, Boing Boing is a group blog with themes including technology and science fiction; HuffPost blogs include opinions on subjects such as politics, entertainment, and technology. There are also travel blogs such as Head for Points, Adventurous Kate, and an early form of The Points Guy.

Websites 

Entertainment social media and information sharing websites include Reddit, 9Gag, 4chan, Upworthy and Newgrounds. Sites like 9Gag allow users to create memes and quick video clips. Sites like Tech in Asia and Buzzfeed engage readers with professional communities by posting articles with user-generated comment sections. Other websites include fanfiction sites such as FanFiction.Net; imageboards; artwork communities like DeviantArt; mobile photos and video sharing sites such as Picasa and Flickr; audio social networks such as SoundCloud; crowd funding or crowdsourcing sites like Kickstarter, Indiegogo, and ArtistShare; and customer review sites such as Yelp.

After launching in the mid-2000s, major UGC-based adult websites like Pornhub, YouPorn and xHamster and became the dominant mode of consumption and distribution of pornographic content on the internet. The appearance of pornographic content on sites like Wikipedia and Tumblr led moderators and site owners to institute stricter limits on uploads.

The travel industry, in particular, has begun utilizing user-generated content to show authentic traveler experiences. Travel-related companies such as The Millennial, Gen Z, and Busabout relaunched their websites featuring UGC images and social content by their customers posted in real time. TripAdvisor includes reviews and recommendations by travelers about hotels, restaurants, and activities.

The restaurant industry has also been altered by a review system the places more emphasis on online reviews and content from peers than traditional media reviews. In 2011 Yelp contained 70% of reviews for restaurants in the Seattle area compared to Food & Wine Magazine containing less than 5 percent.

Video games
Video games can have fan-made content in the form of mods, fan patches, fan translations or server emulators. Some games come with level editor programs to aid in their creation. A few massively multiplayer online games including Star Trek Online, Dota 2, and EverQuest 2 have UGC systems integrated into the game itself. A metaverse can be a user-generated world, such as Second Life. Second Life is a 3-D virtual world which provides its users with tools to modify the game world and participate in an economy, trading user content created via online creation for virtual currency.

Advertising
A popular use of UGC involves collaboration between a brand and a user. An example is the "Elf Yourself" videos by Jib Jab that come back every year around Christmas. The Jib Jab website lets people use their photos of friends and family that they have uploaded to make a holiday video to share across the internet. You cut and paste the faces of the people in the pictures to animated dancing elves.

Some brands are also using UGC images to boost the performance of their paid social ads. For example, Toyota leveraged UGC for their "Feeling the Streets" Facebook ad campaign and were able to increase their total ad engagement by 440%.

Retailers
Some bargain hunting websites feature user-generated content, such as eBay, Dealsplus, and FatWallet which allow users to post, discuss, and control which bargains get promoted within the community. Because of the dependency of social interaction, these sites fall into the category of social commerce.

Educational
Wikipedia, a free encyclopedia, is one of the largest user-generated content databases in the world. Platforms such as YouTube have frequently been used as an instructional aide. Organizations such as the Khan Academy and the Green brothers have used the platform to upload series of videos on topics such as math, science, and history to help aid viewers master or better understand the basics. Educational podcasts have also helped in teaching through an audio platform. Personal websites and messaging systems like Yahoo Messenger have also been used to transmit user-generated educational content. There have also been web forums where users give advice to each other.

Students can also manipulate digital images or video clips to their advantage and tag them with easy to find keywords then share them to friends and family worldwide. The category of "student performance content" has risen in the form of discussion boards and chat logs. Students could write reflective journals and diaries that may help others. The websites SparkNotes and Shmoop are used to summarize and analyze books so that they are more accessible to the reader.

Photo sharing
Photo sharing websites are another popular form of UGC. Flickr is a site in which users are able to upload personal photos they have taken and label them in regards to their "motivation". Flickr not only hosts images but makes them publicly available for reuse and reuse with modification. Instagram is a social media platform that allows users to edit, upload and include location information with photos they post. Panoramio.com and Flickr use metadata, such as GPS coordinates that allows for geographic placement of images.

Video sharing 
Video sharing websites are another popular form of UGC. YouTube and TikTok allow users to create and upload videos.

Effect on journalism
The incorporation of user-generated content into mainstream journalism outlets is considered to have begun in 2005 with the BBC's creation of a user-generated content team, which was expanded and made permanent in the wake of the 7 July 2005 London bombings. The incorporation of Web 2.0 technologies into news websites allowed user-generated content online to move from more social platforms such as MySpace, LiveJournal, and personal blogs, into the mainstream of online journalism, in the form of comments on news articles written by professional journalists, but also through surveys, content sharing, and other forms of citizen journalism.

Since the mid-2000s, journalists and publishers have had to consider the effects that user-generated content has had on how news gets published, read, and shared. A 2016 study on publisher business models suggests that readers of online news sources value articles written both by professional journalists, as well as users—provided that those users are experts in a field relevant to the content that they create. In response to this, it is suggested that online news sites must consider themselves not only a source for articles and other types of journalism but also a platform for engagement and feedback from their communities. The ongoing engagement with a news site that is possible due to the interactive nature of user-generated content is considered a source of sustainable revenue for publishers of online journalism going forward.

Journalists are increasingly sourcing UGC from platforms, such as Facebook and TikTok, as news shifts to a digital space. This form of crowdsourcing can include using user content to support claims, using social media platforms to contact witnesses and obtain relevant images and videos for articles.

Use in marketing
The use of user-generated content has been prominent in the efforts of marketing online, especially among millennials. A good reason for this may be that 86% of consumers say authenticity is important when deciding which brands they support, and 60% believe user-generated content is not only the most authentic form of content, but also the most influential when making purchasing decisions.

An increasing number of companies have been employing UGC techniques into their marketing efforts, such as Starbucks with their "White Cup Contest" campaign where customers competed to create the best doodle on their cups.

The effectiveness of UGC in marketing has been shown to be significant as well. For instance, the "Share a Coke" by Coca-Cola campaign in which customers uploaded images of themselves with bottles to social media attributed to a two percent increase in revenue. Of millennials, UGC can influence purchase decisions up to fifty-nine percent of the time, and eighty-four percent say that UGC on company websites has at least some influence on what they buy, typically in a positive way. As a whole, consumers place peer recommendations and reviews above those of professionals.

User-generated content used in a marketing context has been known to help brands in numerous ways. 
 It encourages more engagement with its users, and doubles the likeliness that the content will be shared. 
 It builds trust with consumers. With a majority of consumers trusting UGC over brand provided information, UGC can allow for better brand-consumer relationships.
 It provides SEO Value for brands. This in turn means more traffic is driven to the brands websites and that more content is linked back to the website.
 It reassures purchase decisions which will keep customers shopping. With UGC, the conversion rate increases by as much as 4.6%.
 It increases follower count on various social media platforms.
 It helps integration with traditional marketing/promotional techniques which in turn drives more conversions for the companies.
 It helps in increasing profit with significant reduction in costs for the company.
 It typically low cost promotion since content given by free for firm's customers.

User-generated Content Facts & Statistics

 86% of companies leverage UGC in their marketing techniques
 92% of potential customers seek reviews from existing customers
 64% of customers look for reviews, and ratings before they start their checkout process. 
 90% of brands have seen an evident increase in their click-through rates using UGC in their ads. 
 Keeping your emails authentic and genuine can help increase the click-through rate by 73%. 
 35% of Gen Z trusts UGC
74% increase is found in conversion rates simply because of UGC used in the product pages.

Opportunities
There are many opportunities in user-generated content. The advantage of UGC is that it is a quick, easy way to reach the masses. Here are some examples:

 The companies could use social media for branding, and set up contests for the audience to submit their own creations.
 The consumers and general audience members like to engage. Some have used a storytelling platform to both share and converse with others.
 To raise awareness, whether it be for an organization, company, or event.
Reviews play a major role in a customers decision making.
 Gain perspectives from members that one wouldn't otherwise get to engage with.
 Personalization of the content put out; 71% of consumers like personalized ads.
 Encouraging participation can be weakened by company claims to owning this content.

Criticism
The term "user-generated content" has received some criticism. The criticism to date has addressed issues of fairness, quality, privacy, the sustainable availability of creative work and effort among legal issues namely related to intellectual property rights such as copyrights etc.

Some commentators assert that the term "user" implies an illusory or unproductive distinction between different kinds of "publishers", with the term "users" exclusively used to characterize publishers who operate on a much smaller scale than traditional mass-media outlets or who operate for free. Such classification is said to perpetuate an unfair distinction that some argue is diminishing because of the prevalence and affordability of the means of production and publication. A better response might be to offer optional expressions that better capture the spirit and nature of such work, such as EGC, Entrepreneurial Generated Content (see external reference below).

Sometimes creative works made by individuals are lost because there are limited or no ways to precisely preserve creations when a UGC Web site service closes down. One example of such loss is the closing of the Disney massively multiplayer online game "VMK". VMK, like most games, has items that are traded from user to user. Many of these items are rare within the game. Users are able to use these items to create their own rooms, avatars and pin lanyard. This site shut down at 10 pm CDT on 21 May 2008. There are ways to preserve the essence, if not the entirety of such work through the users copying text and media to applications on their personal computers or recording live action or animated scenes using screen capture software, and then uploading elsewhere. Long before the Web, creative works were simply lost or went out of publication and disappeared from history unless individuals found ways to keep them in personal collections.

Another criticized aspect is the vast array of user-generated product and service reviews that can at times be misleading for consumer on the web. 
A study conducted at Cornell University found that an estimated 1 to 6 percent of positive user-generated online hotel reviews are fake.

Another concern of platforms that rely heavily on user-generated content, such as Twitter and Facebook, is how easy it is to find people who holds the same opinions and interests in addition to how well they facilitate the creation of networks or closed groups. While the strength of these services are that users can broaden their horizon by sharing their knowledge and connect with other people from around the world, these platforms also make it very easy to connect with only a restricted sample of people who holds similar opinions (see Filter bubble).

There is also criticism regarding whether or not those who contribute to a platform should be paid for their content. In 2015, A group of 18 famous content creators on Vine attempted to negotiate a deal with Vine representatives to secure a $1.2 million contract for a guaranteed 12 videos a month. This negotiation was not successful.

Legal problems
The ability for services to accept user-generated content opens up a number of legal concerns, from the broader sense to specific local laws. In general, knowing who committed the online crime is difficult because many use pseudonyms or remain anonymous. Sometimes it can be traced back. But in the case of a public coffee shop, they have no way of pinpointing the exact user. There is also a problem with the issues surrounding extremely harmful but not legal acts. For example, the posting of content that instigates a person's suicide. It is a criminal offense if there is proof of "beyond reasonable doubt" but different situations may produce different outcomes. Depending on the country, there is certain laws that come with the Web 2.0. In the United States, the "Section 230" exemptions of the Communications Decency Act state that "no provider or user of an interactive computer service shall be treated as the publisher or speaker of any information provided by another information content provider." This clause effectively provides a general immunity for websites that host user-generated content that is defamatory, deceptive or otherwise harmful, even if the operator knows that the third-party content is harmful and refuses to take it down. An exception to this general rule may exist if a website promises to take down the content and then fails to do so.

Copyright laws
Copyright laws also play a factor in relation to user-generated content, as users may use such services to upload works—particularly videos—that they do not have the sufficient rights to distribute. In many cases, the use of these materials may be covered by local "fair use" laws, especially if the use of the material submitted is transformative. Local laws also vary on who is liable for any resulting copyright infringements caused by user-generated content; in the United States, the Online Copyright Infringement Liability Limitation Act (OCILLA)—a portion of the Digital Millennium Copyright Act (DMCA), dictates safe harbor provisions for "online service providers" as defined under the act, which grants immunity from secondary liability for the copyright-infringing actions of their users, as long as they promptly remove access to allegedly infringing materials upon the receipt of a notice from a copyright holder or registered agent, and they do not have actual knowledge that their service is being used for infringing activities.

In the UK, the Defamation Act of 1996 says that if a person is not the author, editor or publisher and did not know about the situation, they are not convicted. Furthermore, ISPs are not considered authors, editors, or publishers and they cannot have responsibility for people they have no "effective control" over. Just like the DMCA, once the ISP learns about the content, they must delete it immediately. The European Union's approach is horizontal by nature, which means that civil and criminal liability issues are addressed under the Electronic Commerce Directive. Section 4 deals with liability of the ISP while conducting "mere conduit" services, caching and web hosting services.

Research
A study on YouTube analyzing one of the Video On Demand systems was conducted in 2007. The length of the video had decreased by two-fold from the non-UGC content but they saw a fast production rate. The user behavior is what perpetuates the UGC. The act of P2P (Peer-to-Peer) was studied and saw a great benefit to the system. They also studied the impact of content aliasing, sharing of multiple copies, and illegal uploads.

A study from York University in Ontario in 2012 conducted research that resulted in a proposed framework for comparing brand-related UGC and to understand how the strategy used by a company could influence the brand sentiment across different social media channels including YouTube, Twitter and Facebook. The three scholars of this study examined two clothing brands, Lulu Lemon and American Apparel. The difference between these two brands is that Lulu Lemon had a social media following while American Apparel was the complete opposite with no social media following. Unsurprisingly, Lulu Lemon had much more positive contributions compared to American Apparel which had less positive contributions. Lulu Lemon has three times the number of positive contributions, 64 percent vs 22 percent for American Apparel on Twitter while on Facebook and YouTube, they had roughly an equal number of contributions. This proves that social media can influence how a brand is perceived, usually in a more positive light. A study by Dhar and Chang, published in 2007, found that the volume of blogs posted on a music album was positively correlated with future sales of that album.

See also

 Carr-Benkler wager
 Cognitive Surplus
 Collective intelligence
 Communal marketing
 Consumer generated marketing
 Content moderation
 Creative Commons
 Crowdsourcing
 Customer engagement
 Digital public square
 Fan art
 Fan fiction
 Modding
 Networked information economy
 Participatory culture
 Participatory design
 Prosumer
 User-centered design
 User-generated TV
 User innovation
 Web 2.0

General sources

Citations

External links

 OECD study on the Participative Web: User Generated Content
 A Bigger Bang—an overview of the UGC trend on the Web in 2006
 https://hbr.org/2016/03/branding-in-the-age-of-social-media

 
Collective intelligence
Digital media
New media
Video game design